Fossil wood, also known as fossilized tree, is wood that is preserved in the fossil record.  Over time the wood will usually be the part of a plant that is best preserved (and most easily found).  Fossil wood may or may not be petrified, in which case it is known as petrified wood or petrified tree. The study of fossil wood is sometimes called palaeoxylology, with a "palaeoxylologist" somebody who studies fossil wood.

The fossil wood may be the only part of the plant that has been preserved, with the rest of the plant completely unknown: therefore such wood may get a special kind of botanical name. This will usually include "xylon" and a term indicating its presumed affinity, such as Araucarioxylon (wood of Araucaria or some related genus), Palmoxylon (wood of an indeterminate palm), or Castanoxylon (wood of an indeterminate chinkapin).

Types

Petrified wood

Petrified wood are fossils of wood that have turned to stone through the process of permineralization. All organic materials are replaced with minerals while maintaining the original structure of the wood.

The most notable example is the petrified forest in Arizona.

Mummified wood
Mummified wood are fossils of wood that have not permineralized. They are formed when trees are buried rapidly in dry cold or hot environments. They are valued in paleobotany because they retain original cells and tissues capable of being examined with the same techniques used with extant plants in dendrology.

Notable examples include the mummified forests in Ellesmere Island and Axel Heiberg Island.

Submerged forests

Submerged forests are remains of trees submerged by marine transgression. They are important in determining sea level rise since the last glacial period.

See also
Amber
Dendrochronology
Paleobotany
Xyloid lignite

References

Fossil record of plants
Wood
Paleobotany